Pledger is a surname. Notable people with the surname include:

 Adrian Pledger (born 1976), American basketball player
 Alex Pledger (born 1987), New Zealand basketball player
 Bill Pledger (1852–1904), lawyer
 David Pledger, Australian artist
 Malcolm Pledger (born 1948), British retired Royal Air Force air chief marshal
 Orpheus Pledger (born 1993), Australian actor
 Shirley Pledger, New Zealand mathematician and statistician
 Warren Jackson Pledger, American molecular biologist

See also
 Jacob Pledger House, a landmark in Connecticut